Boris Stoyanov Drangov (15 March 1872–26 May 1917) was a Bulgarian colonel and warfare pedagogue.

Drangov was born in Skopje in Ottoman-ruled Macedonia (today the capital of North Macedonia), to the family of a rich timber merchant. He graduated from the local Bulgarian Exarchate school or the Bulgarian Men's High School of Thessaloniki. In 1891, he enrolled in the Military School in Sofia in the Principality of Bulgaria. After a conflict with an officer, he was dispatched to Lom in 1894; in the town, Drangov met his future wife (also from Macedonia) and was promoted to second lieutenant in 1895. In 1899, he became a first lieutenant.

During the Ilinden–Preobrazhenie Uprising of 1903, Drangov left the Bulgarian Army to arrive in Macedonia. There, he assembled an armed detachment of 120 men which fought the Ottomans in the Kratovo region. After the uprising's suppression, Drangov returned to the army and was promoted to rotmistar (cavalry captain). He studied at the Imperial Russian General Staff Academy in Saint Petersburg; he graduated with honours in 1907 and returned to Bulgarian service. Promoted to major in 1910, he became a lecturer of military tactics at the Military School in Sofia.

During the First Balkan War of 1912–1913, Drangov headed a brigade on the Thracian front, defeating the Ottomans at Çatalca and during the Siege of Adrianople. During the Second Balkan War, Drangov fought the Serbs at Bublyak Peak. In February 1915, he was promoted to lieutenant-colonel.

With the outbreak of World War I, Drangov was named as the head of a regiment consisting mainly of untrained Macedonian Bulgarian volunteers. Under his training, the regiment turned into an efficient unit and fought at Kalimanci, Kočani and Štip. He also fought at the Romanian front in Dobruja before he was dispatched back to Macedonia, where his unit guarded the River Crna meander. He was wounded during artillery shelling on 26 May 1917 and died of his wounds the same evening.

Boris Drangov was interred in the Saint Demetrius Church's yard in Skopje. His remains were later moved by the Serbian authorities to a common cemetery. Drangov was posthumously promoted to colonel by the Bulgarian Army.

Honours
Three villages in Bulgaria bear Boris Drangov's name: Drangovo, Kardzhali Province, Drangovo, Blagoevgrad Province and Drangovo, Plovdiv Province. Drangov Peak in the Breznik Heights on Greenwich Island, Antarctica, was also named after him.

References

 Шишков, К., Полковник Борис Дрангов — избрани произведения, Военно издателство, София, 1985.
 Шишков, К., Преподавателят майор Борис Дрангов., „Военнисторически сборник“, 1985, № 5.
 Недев, Светлозар, Командването на българската войска през войните за национално обединение, Военноиздателски комплекс „Свети Георги Победоносец“, София, 1993, стр. 181.
 Борис Дрангов. Сборник материали и научни изследвания. София, 1993.
 Карнфилов, Ефрем. Борис Дрангов в: Ефрем Каранфилов, „Българи“, София, 1980.
 Узунов, Христо. Полковник Борис Дрангов, „Армейски преглед“, 1986, №10.
 Sega newspaper of 8 November 2005

1872 births
1917 deaths
Military personnel from Skopje
Bulgarian military personnel of the Balkan Wars
Bulgarian military personnel of World War I
Bulgarian military personnel killed in World War I
Recipients of the Order of Bravery
Bulgarian revolutionaries
Macedonian Bulgarians
Bulgarian Men's High School of Thessaloniki alumni